One September Afternoon is a 1981 jazz album by saxophonist Art Pepper playing with Stanley Cowell, Howard Roberts, Cecil McBee and Carl Burnett.

The personnel is the same as on Pepper's previous album, Winter Moon, but without the strings.

Track listing
"Mr. Big Falls His J.G. Hand" (Art Pepper) – 6:09
"Close To You Alone" (Cecil McBee) – 6:43
"There Will Never Be Another You" (Harry Warren, Mack Gordon) – 6:09
"Melolev" (Art Pepper) – 5:27
"Goodbye, Again!" (Stanley Cowell) – 6:23
"Brazil" (Ary Barroso) – 8:30
(Recorded on 5 September 1980.)

Personnel
Art Pepper – alto saxophone
Stanley Cowell – piano
Howard Roberts – guitar (on "Mr. Big" and "Brazil" only)
Cecil McBee – bass
Carl Burnett – drums

Stanley Cowell does not play on "Brazil"; Howard Roberts adds a second guitar part.

References

Sources
Richard Cook & Brian Morton. The Penguin Guide to Jazz on CD. Penguin, 4th edition, 1998. 

1980 albums
Art Pepper albums
Galaxy Records albums